Oscar Corrochano (born 6 September 1976) is a German-Spanish football former player and current coach.

Coaching career
From 2006 to 2012, he was manager of several youth teams of Eintracht Frankfurt. On 15 June 2012, Corrochano was named head coach of SSV Jahn Regensburg in the 2. Bundesliga, but was sacked on 4 November 2012 due to lack of success. On 4 October 2016, he became manager of SV Eintracht Trier. On 15 July 2017, he was appointed as the head coach of Sportfreunde Lotte. He left just 12 days later.

Coaching record

References

External links

1976 births
Living people
Sportspeople from Hanau
German footballers
German people of Spanish descent
Association football midfielders
2. Bundesliga players
Eintracht Frankfurt players
Kickers Offenbach players
SV Darmstadt 98 players
SV Waldhof Mannheim players
Eintracht Frankfurt managers
SSV Jahn Regensburg managers
2. Bundesliga managers
3. Liga managers
Sportfreunde Lotte managers
Footballers from Hesse
German football managers